Leaving Home may refer to:

 Leaving Home – the Life & Music of Indian Ocean, a 2010 Indian documentary
 Leaving Home (play), a 1972 play by David French
 Leaving Home: A Collection of Lake Wobegon Stories, a 1987 story collection by Garrison Keillor
 Leaving Home: The Therapy of Disturbed Young People, a 1997 book by Jay Haley
 "Leaving Home" (Jebediah song), 1997
 "Leaving Home" (Nicke Borg song), 2011
 Leaving Home EP, a 2012 EP by T. Mills